Henry Hayes Vowles (26 June 1843, Victoria Park Farm, Bath, England – 13 November 1905, Gloucester, England) was an English author, theologian and a Wesleyan Minister.  He also published religious poetry.

Parents
He was the son of Henry Vowles (13 October 1816 – 17 February 1883, Reading ) of Bath and Mary Yeoman Harding (18 December 1812 – 10 January 1886, Lyme Regis) of "The Chancellor" Wanstrow, Somerset. The parents of Henry Vowles (b. 1816) were James Vowles (a dairyman) of 2 Quiet Street Bath, (born 2 March 1785 buried 6/2/1859) and Martha Edney (born 1789).  James Vowles was the son of William Vowles (a Dairy farmer) of Walcot (buried 1809) and Hannah Hancock. William Vowles was the son of James Vowles and Martha Jane married at Bath Abbey on 6 August 1728.

Rev. Henry Hayes Vowles' father, Henry, is recorded as being employed in a number of roles.  In 1838, he is noted as a "yeoman" on a wedding certificate.  This piece of evidence is particularly interesting as the whole document, including witnesses' signatures, is completed in the same hand as the Rector.  All of the men on the certificate are described as yeomen.  In 1851, his occupation was described as a "Carrier's Agent".  In 1871, his occupation was recorded as "farmer" He is cited on family trees as a "dairy man".  Henry "after getting through two fortunes and driving his wife from home" was steadily employed by Huntley and Palmers of Reading where he died and was buried.

His mother, Mary Yeoman Vowles née Harding, led "a life of much sadness, but her sweet disposition, like her mother's, made her a favourite with everybody". Mary Harding's brother was Joseph Harding who standardised the production of modern Cheddar Cheese. They were the children of Joseph Harding and Mary Yeoman.  The parents of this Mary Yeoman were the diarists John Yeoman  and Mary Yeoman, both of Wanstrow.

The Harding family had originally come from Pewsey, Wiltshire.

Siblings
Rev. Henry Hayes Vowles had three siblings (All four were born at Bath Park Farm):
 John Alonzo Vowles (born Bath Sept 1845) of Bruton who drowned at Stalbridge (20 July 1865) and was buried there (24 July 1865).  This is documented as below:  
"A fine young man, aged 20 years, residing at Whadden farm, Bruton, and who was on a visit to his sister (Mrs Collins), of this town.  It appears that on the day in question he called at the house of Mr Eli Benjafield, Marshmoor farm, where he took dinner, leaving there about three o'clock, with two of Mr. Benjafield's sons (boys), for the purpose of bathing in the river Stour.  He separated from the young Benjafields a few yards, undressed himself, and plunged into the water, and almost immediately afterwards he was seen struggling in the river.  The boys were frightened, and called a to a man named Robert Turke, who was working within thirty yards of the spot, but he only reached the river in time to see the poor unfortunate man sink; and the water being very deep, the body was not got out for more than an hour afterwards.  He is supposed to have been seized with cramp immediately upon entering the water, and was drowned in less than five minutes from the time he reached the river.  An inquest was held at the Red Lion Inn, on the 20th inst by W.H.R. Bennett, Esq, deputy coroner, when the above factors were enumerated and the jury returned a verdict of "accidental Death".  This account states the death occurred on the 19th.
 Mary Yeoman Harding Vowles who married Alfred Collins (b. 1827) of Stalbridge and had thirteen children
 James Harding Vowles (31 January 1840 – 1877) of Edmonton, Canada.  He married Fanny Patterson (1844–1863). He died in poverty soon after emigrating, but left descendants in Ontario.

Their mother Mary Vowles née Harding died at Stalbridge and was buried beside her son Alonzo's grave (see image).

Henry and Alonzo were educated at the expense of John Harding of Holly Bank, Balcombe, Dorset.  This was because their father Henry had "led a very intemperate and wild life and spent two fortunes in driving his wife and family homeless.  It was not safe for her to continue living with [him] and so she came to my mother at Grosvenor House".

Early life
In 1841 his parents were resident at Park Farm, Marlborough Street, Walcot, Lansdown, Bath with their one-year-old son James. In 1851 Vowles was resident at Kingsmead Terrace, Bath aged 8 and described as a scholar. He did not attend Kingswood school

Later life
Henry Hayes Vowles was ordained in 1867.

During his lifetime, he also ministered in the following circuits:  Faversham, Nelson, Blackpool, Birmingham, Pembroke, Stockton-on-Tees, Southwark, Gateshead and Barnsley. He was also based at Southwark

He went to work in Gloucester in 1895 as Superintendent of the Gloucester Wesleyan Circuit, which post he held for three years.  He then went to Guernsey as Chairman of the Channel Islands District.  In 1901, he returned to Gloucester as Supernumerary Minister.   He was an accomplished Hebrew and Greek scholar and published at least two of his sermons.  He served on the Gloucester City Education Committee.

In 1901, he was resident at St Peter Port, Guernsey.

Marriage and children
He married Hannah Elizabeth Thistle (18 November 1842 – 31 March 1903 and buried at Gloucester Cemetery) at St Mary's church Whitby on 29 August 1871. Hannah Elizabeth Thistle was born at 157 Mill Street, Liverpool and was the daughter of Thomas Thistle (1813–1892) and Alice Smith (1876–1893).  This Thomas Thistle was the son of Thomas and Martha Thistle (née Wilson) of Blue Band (?), Whitby.  Hannah Vowles was the sister of Thomas Thistle. Alice Smith was the daughter of George Smith.

In 1881 he was resident at Thornaby, Yorkshire.

He had seven children:
 Thomas Hubert Harding Vowles J.P., A.R.I.B.A. (born Belgrave Terrace, Sheffield Road, Barsley 7 December 1872, died 1946) (educated at King Edward's School, Birmingham and became an Architect in Gloucester and Beningbrough, York)
 Alice Thistle Vowles (born at 3 Regent's street, Gateshead 1 October 1874 – 1928)
 Mary Yeoman Hardinge Vowles (born at 1 Bedford Place, Gateshead 14 November 1876).  Married Henry Allen Pearce of Priday, Metford and Company Limited
 Henry Hayes Vowles (junior) (born at 143 Jamaica Road, Bermondsey, London on 11 March 1878, died 1955) who was a solicitor in Gloucester and a Captain in the Gloucestershire Regiment in the first world war. In 1917 he was a Lieutenant in B Company, the 13th Glosters with the BEF in France.  Later a lawyer at 65 Northgate Street, Gloucester.  His partner Mr Russell Jessop was honorary solicitor 1960 to Gloucester Football & Athletic Ground Company
 Brenley Mabel Vowles (born at 143 Jamaica Road, Bermondsey, London 29 Dec 1879) later keeper of the Cottage Tea Room, Caterham
 Guy Vowles (born at Morley House, Actiland (?) Terrace, South Stockton, Thornaby 27 May 1882, died 1936)
 Hugh Pembroke Vowles born at Pembroke 22 July 1885, died 1951).  Married Margaret Winifred Pearce

Rev HH Vowles' brother James Harding Vowles son emigrated to Ontario, Canada and died there soon after.  He left a number of Vowles descendants in the province.

Publications (books)
For Ever and Ever: A Popular Study in Hebrew, Greek and English Words published by Swan Sonnenschein & Co (London), 1898.
Two Sermons. I. King David and Queen Victoria. II. King Lemuel and King Edward published by C. H. Kelly: London, 1901.

Publications (poetry)
Poem published in 1889 in the Wesleyan-Methodist Magazine: Being a Continuation of the Arminian Or Methodist Magazine
Poem entitled "An Advent Sonnet" published in the Wesleyan-Methodist Magazine.  Date uncertain.
Poem entitled "Sinai" published in the Wesleyan-Methodist.  Date uncertain.

Death and obituaries
Vowles died at his residence, Holmleigh, Kingsholm, Gloucester
A number of obituaries were published at the time of his death, in local Gloucester papers and Methodist publications.  The following is repeated here verbatim:
"Henry H. Vowles: was born at Bath, 26 June 1843, and entered the Ministry in 1867.  His first appointment was to Faversham, and he laboured in the active ministry until the Conference of 1901.  He was an able preacher, a vigorous thinker, and a man of scholarly attainments.  His freshness of thought and his power of lucid exposition made his sermons attractive and profitable.  His sympathy with the young, his sound judgment, and his varied attainments won for him the confidence and affection of our people.  He was cheerful and patient during his painful and prolonged illness, and his faith in his Lord and Saviour was expressed in the words of the Psalm which he had chosen to be read on the day of his burial: "The Lord is my light and my salvation; whom shall I fear? The Lord is the strength of my life; of whom shall I be afraid?".  Much more might be said of his character and ministry; but it was his earnest request that as little as possible might be written about him.  He died at Gloucester, 13 November 1905 in his sixty-third year and in the thirty-eighth of his ministry."

References

Most of the information above has come from a copy of an obituary in an unknown newspaper, presumably from Gloucester

English religious writers
English theologians
English Methodists
Methodist theologians
People from Bath, Somerset
1843 births
1905 deaths
People from Gloucester
English male non-fiction writers